Orion Expedition Cruises (OEC) is a former Australian-based luxury expedition cruise line that operated the German-built 103 m, 4000 gross tonne  in Australasian and Antarctic waters.

History 
Founded by Australian businesswoman Sarina Bratton in early 2004, Orion Expedition Cruises began cruising operations in March 2005 with the repositioning cruise of the MV Orion from Papeete, Tahiti in French Polynesia to Sydney, Australia via the Cook Islands, Samoa, New Caledonia, Fiji and Lord Howe Island. OEC operated Australian-based expedition cruises in areas as diverse as the Antarctic continent to Papua New Guinea and the Solomon Islands.

On 20 May 2008, Bratton, then managing director, announced the purchase of the company by US private equity firm KSL Capital Partners, and Cruise Ferry Master Fund (CFMF), a division of German shipping bank DVB.

On 5 March 2013 it was announced that OEC had been acquired by US-based small ship operator Lindblad Expeditions, which owns five ships and charters a further five and operates cruises to a variety of destinations. CFMF also holds a 60% interest in Lindblad Expeditions.

Operations 

The concept behind the formation of the operation was to bring a new flavour of locally based luxury expedition-style cruising to Australia.

In 2005 OEC made history by being the first cruise line to take a ship into the newly independent nation of East Timor. Visiting the capital Dili and the nation's second largest center Baucau, guests of the Orion were some of the first tourists to be part of organized travel in the country. OEC planned to continue and expand their operations in East Timor in 2006, but the company's plans were suspended when the fledgling nation became unstable just a few weeks before the Orion was due to dock in Dili in June 2006. The Indonesian port of Kupang in West Timor replaced Dili in OEC's itinerary.

The company offered expedition cruises to Antarctica from the Australian island of Tasmania and the New Zealand port of Bluff, in the remote Kimberley region of Western Australia from the port of Darwin, to Papua New Guinea and the Solomon Islands from the ports of Cairns and Rabaul as well as occasional cruises along the east coast of Australia focusing on the Great Barrier Reef and some cruising around Tasmania.

Following OEC's acquisition by Lindblad Expeditions in March 2013, it was announced that cruises to Orion's destination mainstays of Indonesia, Borneo, Papua New Guinea and the Kimberleys would continue. In March 2014 itineraries to more easterly and remote Pacific islands were added. Orion was to be equipped with an underwater remotely operated vehicle (ROV), capacity for up to 24 scuba divers and oceangoing kayaks, with cruises to be accompanied by a National Geographic photographer.

In a statement in January 2015, Lindblad surprised the industry by announcing that Orion would be based in Europe for the northern summer from 2016, ceasing Southern Hemisphere winter operations.

MV Orion  

The luxury expedition ship , the backbone of OEC, has been described by the Berlitz Guide to Cruising as "the latest in the quest to build the perfect expedition vessel". Owned by the Marshall Islands registered company Explorer Maritime and leased under a long-term agreement by OEC, the vessel was previously operated, albeit for a short time, by US-based cruise operator Travel Dynamics International (TDI). TDI had operated the vessel in the Antarctic and the Arctic and many points in between before handing the vessel over to OEC in the Tahitian port of Papeete in March 2005.

The MV Orion will be renamed the National Geographic Orion from March 2014, and join Lindblad Expeditions owned National Geographic Endeavour, MS National Geographic Explorer, National Geographic Islander, National Geographic Sea Bird and National Geographic Sea Lion, along with their chartered vessels Delfin II, Jahan, Lord of the Glens, Oceanic Discoverer and Sea Cloud.

Vessel specifications
Length: 103 metres
Beam: 14.25 metres
Draft: 3.82 metres
Hull: Ice-reinforced for voyages in the Arctic and Antarctic 
Ice Class: E3 (Germanischer Lloyd) 
Gross Tonnage: 4,000
Engines: Mak; 8M25; 3,265HP
Speed: 14.0 knots
Stabilisers: Blohm & Voss, retractable fin stabilisers
Manoeuvrability: Bow and stern thrusters
Year Built: 2003
Delivery Date: November 2003
Builder: Cassens Shipyard-Emden, Germany
Staterooms and Suites: 53
Guest Capacity: 106 (twin occupancy). 24 additional guests may be accommodated in convertible sofa or upper Pullman beds.
Elevator: Yes
Classification: Germanischer Lloyd; 100 A5 E3 Passenger Ship; MC E3 AUT
Regulations: Orion is built according to the latest international safety regulations, including those of the U.S. Coast Guard, U.S. Public Health, Canadian Arctic Shipping, and St. Lawrence Seaway.
Additional Craft: 10 Zodiac Heavy Duty MK5 Inflatables, 10 Sea Kayaks, and a Fishing Boat
Communications: Direct-dial satellite telephones; fax; e-mail; Internet access; internal telephone system
Registry: Bahamas and manned and providored by V-Ships Leisure, of Monaco.

See also 
 List of cruise ships
 List of cruise lines

References

External links 
Orion Expedition Cruises homepage
Cassens-Werft Shipyard homepage

Cruise lines
Expedition cruising
Shipping companies of Australia